Bast is a surname. Notable people with the surname include:

Dieter Bast (born 1951), German footballer
Jason Bast (born 1989), Canadian ice hockey player
Joseph Bast (born 1958),  CEO of the Heartland Institute
Ørnulf Bast (1907–1974), Norwegian sculptor and painter
Ryan Bast (born 1975), Canadian ice hockey player
William Bast (1931–2015), American screenwriter and writer
Surnames from given names